The Cheremosh River is a river in western Ukraine, right-bank tributary of the river Prut.

Description
Chornyi Cheremosh is 87 km long with a basin of 856 km2 and Bilyi Cheremosh is 61 km long with a basin of 606 km2. The river starts in the Carpathian Mountains and flows roughly SW to NE. It leaves the Bukovina Obchinas (a mountain range in Outer Eastern Carpathians stretching in Ukraine and Romania) to the river's right, and the historic subregion of Pokuttya to the river's left side.

It flows along the borderline of the historic regions of Bukovina and Galicia. In the Middle Ages and the early modern era, it was part of the borderline between the Principality of Moldavia and Kingdom of Poland. Currently it runs along the borderline between the Ivano-Frankivsk and Chernivtsi Oblasts.

Both banks in the upper part of the river are inhabited by Hutsuls.

Rafting on Cheremosh river

It's hard to find another river on the territory of the former USSR that would be so popular and respectable among water tourists irrespective of its relatively small length. The tradition to hold sports rafting was initiated at the end of the 1950s and in 1967 near the village of Biloberizka and Petrashi the first all-Ukrainian competitions in water tourism on canoe. Since then the Cheremosh has become an avowed arena for holding national competitions, which actually turned into international events due to participation of crews from other countries. The traditions have not been lost up to now and the international popularity of the river grows with every passing year. Why is the Cheremosh so attractive? First, it attracts by unsurpassed beauty of the nature, diversity of the very water-way and the full complex of natural obstacles peculiar for mountain rivers ranging to the highest categories of complexity. The river is full of sudden turns, rapids, shivers (chaotic conglomeration of rocks in the river), floodgates, gorges, and whirlpools that do not allow the knights of oars and a life jacket to relax even for a single minute. The Cheremosh has two faces: mountainous and flat, consequently, after stormy scuffles and troubles in its head water you will feel the pleasure of quiet rest in its lower reaches. A very important advantage of the Cheremosh is the proximity of populated localities where you can stop for night in tourist camps or in private houses since the crucial element in any water trip is the issue of overnight stay under normal conditions: you cannot put too much equipment to a kayak or a canoe! Another important and favourable factor is the convenience of access roads and sufficiently long season of rafting — from early spring to late autumn.

Gallery

External links
 Water routes on Cheremosh river
 Rafting on Cheremosh river

Towns in basin
 Verkhovyna
 Kuty
 Vyzhnytsya
 Vashkivtsi

See also
Pokuttya
Bukovina
Cheremosh Ukrainian Dance Company, named for the river

References 

Bukovina
Rivers of Ivano-Frankivsk Oblast
Rivers of Chernivtsi Oblast
Tributaries of the Prut
Poland–Romania border